The Banzhaf power index, named after John F. Banzhaf III (originally invented by Lionel Penrose in 1946 and sometimes called Penrose–Banzhaf index; also known as the Banzhaf–Coleman index after James Samuel Coleman), is a power index defined by the probability of changing an outcome of a vote where voting rights are not necessarily equally divided among the voters or shareholders.

To calculate the power of a voter using the Banzhaf index, list all the winning coalitions, then count the critical voters. A critical voter is a voter who, if he changed his vote from yes to no, would cause the measure to fail. A voter's power is measured as the fraction of all swing votes that he could cast. There are some algorithms for calculating the power index, e.g., dynamic programming techniques, enumeration methods and Monte Carlo methods.

Examples

Voting game

Simple voting game
A simple voting game, taken from Game Theory and Strategy by Philip D. Straffin:

[6; 4, 3, 2, 1]

The numbers in the brackets mean a measure requires 6 votes to pass, and voter A can cast four votes, B three votes, C two, and D one.  The winning groups, with underlined swing voters, are as follows:

AB, AC, ABC, ABD, ACD, BCD, ABCD

There are 12 total swing votes, so by the Banzhaf index, power is divided thus:

A = 5/12,    B = 3/12,    C = 3/12,    D = 1/12

U.S. Electoral College
Consider the United States Electoral College. Each state has more or less power than the next state. There are a total of 538 electoral votes. A majority vote is 270 votes. The Banzhaf power index would be a mathematical representation of how likely a single state would be able to swing the vote. A state such as California, which is allocated 55 electoral votes, would be more likely to swing the vote than a state such as Montana, which has 3 electoral votes.

Assume the United States is having a presidential election between a Republican (R) and a Democrat (D). For simplicity, suppose that only three states are participating: California (55 electoral votes), Texas (38 electoral votes), and New York (29 electoral votes).

The possible outcomes of the election are:

The Banzhaf power index of a state is the proportion of the possible outcomes in which that state could swing the election. In this example, all three states have the same index: 4/12 or 1/3.

However, if New York is replaced by Georgia, with only 16 electoral votes, the situation changes dramatically.

In this example, the Banzhaf index gives California 1 and the other states 0, since California alone has more than half the votes.

Cartel game 

Five companies (A, B, C, D, E) sign an agreement for the creation of a monopoly. The size of the market is X = 54 million units per year (e.g. petroleum barrels) for a monopoly. The maximum production capacity of these companies is A = 44, B = 32, C = 20, D = 8 and E = 4 million units per year. Therefore, there is a set of coalitions able to provide the 54 million units necessary for the monopoly, and a set of coalitions unable to provide that number. In each of the sufficient coalitions one may have necessary members (for the coalition to provide the required production) and unnecessary members (underlined in the table below). Even when one of these unnecessary members goes out of the sufficient coalition that coalition is able to provide the required production. However, when one necessary member leaves, the sufficient coalition becomes insufficient. The monopoly's profit to be distributed among the coalition's members is 100 million dollars per year.

The Penrose–Banzhaf index may be applied to the calculation of the Shapley value, which provides a basis for a distribution of the profit for each player in the game in proportion to the number of sufficient coalitions in which that player is necessary. The player A is necessary for 10 of the 16 sufficient coalitions, B is necessary for 6, C also for 6, D for 2 and E for 2. Therefore, A is necessary in 38.5% of the total cases (26 = 10 + 6 + 6 + 2 + 2, so 10/26 = 0.385), B in 23.1%, C in 23.1%, D in 7.7% and E in 7.7% (these are the Banzhaf indexes for each company). The distribution of the 100 million of monopoly profits under the Shapley value's criterion has to follow those proportions.

History 
What is known today as the Banzhaf power index was originally introduced by Lionel Penrose in 1946 and went largely forgotten. It was reinvented by John F. Banzhaf III in 1965, but it had to be reinvented once more by James Samuel Coleman in 1971 before it became part of the mainstream literature.

Banzhaf wanted to prove objectively that the Nassau County board's voting system was unfair. As given in Game Theory and Strategy, votes were allocated as follows:

 Hempstead #1: 9
 Hempstead #2: 9
 North Hempstead: 7
 Oyster Bay: 3
 Glen Cove: 1
 Long Beach: 1

This is 30 total votes, and a simple majority of 16 votes was required for a measure to pass.

In Banzhaf's notation, [Hempstead #1, Hempstead #2, North Hempstead, Oyster Bay, Glen Cove, Long Beach] are A-F in [16; 9, 9, 7, 3, 1, 1]

There are 32 winning coalitions, and 48 swing votes:

AB AC BC ABC ABD ABE ABF  ACD ACE ACF BCD BCE BCF ABCD ABCE ABCF ABDE ABDF ABEF ACDE ACDF ACEF BCDE BCDF BCEF ABCDE ABCDF ABCEF ABDEF ACDEF BCDEF ABCDEF

The Banzhaf index gives these values:

 Hempstead #1 = 16/48
 Hempstead #2 = 16/48
 North Hempstead = 16/48
 Oyster Bay = 0/48
 Glen Cove = 0/48
 Long Beach = 0/48

Banzhaf argued that a voting arrangement that gives 0% of the power to 16% of the population is unfair.

Today, the Banzhaf power index is an accepted way to measure voting power, along with the alternative Shapley–Shubik power index. Both measures have been applied to the analysis of voting in the Council of the European Union.

However, Banzhaf's analysis has been critiqued as treating votes like coin-flips, and an empirical model of voting rather than a random voting model as used by Banzhaf brings different results.

See also

 Game theory
 Penrose method
 Penrose square root law

Notes

References

Footnotes

Bibliography

External links 

 Online Power Index Calculator (by Tomomi Matsui)
 Banzhaf Power Index Includes power index estimates for the 1990s U.S. Electoral College.
 Voting Power Perl calculator for the Penrose index.
 Computer Algorithms for Voting Power Analysis Web-based algorithms for voting power analysis
 Power Index Calculator Computes various indices for (multiple) weighted voting games online. Includes some examples.
 Computing Banzhaf power index and Shapley–Shubik power index with Python and R (by Frank Huettner)
 Banzhaf Power Index at the Wolfram Demonstrations Project

Cooperative games
Game theory
Political science theories
Voting theory

de:Machtindex#Banzhaf-Index